The following outline is provided as an overview of and topical guide to Sudan:

Sudan – North Eastern African state,  bordered by Egypt to the north, the Red Sea to the northeast, Eritrea and Ethiopia to the southeast, South Sudan to the south, the Central African Republic to the southwest, Chad to the west and Libya to the northwest. Internally, the river Nile divides the country into eastern and western regions. The population of Sudan is a combination of indigenous African inhabitants and descendants of migrants from the Arabian Peninsula. The overwhelming majority of the population today adhere to Islam.

General reference 

 Pronunciation:
 Common English country name:  Sudan
 Official English country name:  The Republic of Sudan
 Common endonym(s):  As-Sudan  السودان 
 Official endonym(s): Jumhūriyyat as-Sūdān جمهورية السودان (Arabic) 
 Adjectival(s): Sudanese
 Demonym(s):
 ISO country codes:  SD, SDN, 736
 ISO region codes:  See ISO 3166-2:SD
 Internet country code top-level domain:  .sd

Geography of Sudan 

Geography of Sudan
 Sudan is: a country
 Location
 Sudan is situated within the following regions:
 Northern Hemisphere and Eastern Hemisphere
 Africa
 North Africa
 East Africa
 partially within the Sahara Desert
 Greater Middle East
 Time zone:  East Africa Time (UTC+03)
 Extreme points of Sudan
 High:  Kinyeti 
 Low:  Red Sea 0 m
 Land boundaries:  6,751 km
 769 km
 1,360 km
 1,273 km
 175 km
 605 km
 383 km
 1 937 km
 Coastline:  Red Sea 853 km
 Population of Sudan: 30,894,000 (2008)  - 32nd most populous country

 Area of Sudan: 1,886,068 km2
 Atlas of Sudan

Environment of Sudan 

Environment of Sudan
 Climate of Sudan
 Environmental issues in Sudan
 Ecoregions in Sudan
 Wildlife of Sudan
 Fauna of Sudan
 Birds of Sudan
 Mammals of Sudan

Natural geographic features of Sudan 

 Glaciers in Sudan: none 
 Mountains of Sudan
 Volcanoes in Sudan
 Rivers of Sudan
 World Heritage Sites in Sudan

Regions of Sudan 

Regions of Sudan

Ecoregions of Sudan 

List of ecoregions in Sudan
 Ecoregions in Sudan

Administrative divisions of Sudan 

Administrative divisions of Sudan
 States of Sudan
 Districts of Sudan

States of Sudan 

States of Sudan
Blue Nile
Al Jazirah
Kassala
Khartoum
North Darfur
North Kordofan
Northern
Al Qadarif
Red Sea
River Nile
Sennar
South Darfur
South Kordofan
West Darfur
White Nile

Districts of Sudan 

Districts of Sudan

The States of Sudan are subdivided into 133 districts.

Demography of Sudan 

Demographics of Sudan

Government and politics of Sudan 

Politics of Sudan
 Form of government: authoritarian democracy
 Capital of Sudan: Khartoum
 Elections in Sudan
 Political parties in Sudan

Branches of the government of Sudan 

Government of Sudan

Executive branch of the government of Sudan 
 Head of state: President of Sudan,
 Head of government: Prime Minister of Sudan,
 Cabinet of Sudan

Legislative branch of the government of Sudan 

 Parliament of Sudan (bicameral)
 Upper house: Senate of Sudan
 Lower house: House of Commons of Sudan

Judicial branch of the government of Sudan 

Court system of Sudan

Foreign relations of Sudan 

Foreign relations of Sudan
 Diplomatic missions in Sudan
 Diplomatic missions of Sudan

Membership in international organizations 
The Republic of Sudan is a member of:

African, Caribbean, and Pacific Group of States (ACP)
African Development Bank Group (AfDB)
African Union (AU)
Arab Bank for Economic Development in Africa (ABEDA)
Arab Fund for Economic and Social Development (AFESD)
Arab Monetary Fund (AMF)
Common Market for Eastern and Southern Africa (COMESA)
Council of Arab Economic Unity (CAEU)
Food and Agriculture Organization (FAO)
Group of 77 (G77)
Inter-Governmental Authority on Development (IGAD)
International Atomic Energy Agency (IAEA)
International Bank for Reconstruction and Development (IBRD)
International Civil Aviation Organization (ICAO)
International Criminal Court (ICCt) (signatory)
International Criminal Police Organization (Interpol)
International Development Association (IDA)
International Federation of Red Cross and Red Crescent Societies (IFRCS)
International Finance Corporation (IFC)
International Fund for Agricultural Development (IFAD)
International Labour Organization (ILO)
International Maritime Organization (IMO)
International Monetary Fund (IMF)
International Olympic Committee (IOC)
International Organization for Migration (IOM)

International Organization for Standardization (ISO)
International Red Cross and Red Crescent Movement (ICRM)
International Telecommunication Union (ITU)
International Telecommunications Satellite Organization (ITSO)
Inter-Parliamentary Union (IPU)
Islamic Development Bank (IDB)
League of Arab States (LAS)
Multilateral Investment Guarantee Agency (MIGA)
Nonaligned Movement (NAM)
Organization of Islamic Cooperation (OIC)
Organisation for the Prohibition of Chemical Weapons (OPCW)
Permanent Court of Arbitration (PCA)
United Nations (UN)
United Nations Conference on Trade and Development (UNCTAD)
United Nations Educational, Scientific, and Cultural Organization (UNESCO)
United Nations High Commissioner for Refugees (UNHCR)
United Nations Industrial Development Organization (UNIDO)
Universal Postal Union (UPU)
World Customs Organization (WCO)
World Federation of Trade Unions (WFTU)
World Health Organization (WHO)
World Intellectual Property Organization (WIPO)
World Meteorological Organization (WMO)
World Tourism Organization (UNWTO)
World Trade Organization (WTO) (observer)

Law and order in Sudan 

Law of Sudan
 Constitution of Sudan
 Human rights in Sudan
 LGBT rights in Sudan
 Freedom of religion in Sudan
 Law enforcement in Sudan
 Narcotic Drugs and Psychotropic Substances Act (Sudan)

Military of Sudan 

Military of Sudan
 Command
 Commander-in-chief:
 Forces
 Army of Sudan
 Navy of Sudan
 Air Force of Sudan

Local government in Sudan 

Local government in Sudan

History of Sudan 

History of Sudan
 Current events of Sudan

Culture of Sudan

Visual and performing arts in Sudan 
 Literature of Sudan
 Music of Sudan
 Cinema of Sudan
 Photography of Sudan
Visual arts of Sudan
Architecture of Sudan
Fashion of Sudan

General culture of Sudan 
 Cuisine of Sudan
 Languages of Sudan
 Media in Sudan
 Television in Sudan
 National symbols of Sudan
Coat of arms of Sudan
Flag of Sudan
National anthem of Sudan
Orders, decorations, and medals
 People of Sudan
 Public holidays in Sudan
 Religion in Sudan
 Islam in Sudan
 Christianity in Sudan
Hinduism in Sudan
 Archaeological sites in Sudan
 National Museum of Sudan

Sports in Sudan 
 Football in Sudan
 Sudan at the Olympics
 Nuba fighting

Economy and infrastructure of Sudan 

Economy of Sudan
 Economic rank, by nominal GDP (2007): 66th (sixty-sixth)
 Agriculture in Sudan
 Banking in Sudan
 National Bank of Sudan
 Communications in Sudan
 Internet in Sudan
 Companies of Sudan
Currency of Sudan: Pound
ISO 4217: SDG
 Energy in Sudan
 Health care in Sudan
 Mining in Sudan
 Tourism in Sudan
 Transport in Sudan
 Airports in Sudan
 Rail transport in Sudan

Education in Sudan 

Education in Sudan

Health in Sudan 

Health in Sudan

See also 

Sudan
List of international rankings
List of Sudan-related topics
Member state of the United Nations
Outline of Africa
Outline of geography

References

External links 

 Government of Sudan official homepage (in Arabic)
 Sudan.Net
 North/South Sudan Abyei and News and 11 July 2008 and UN SRSG for Sudan Praises Abyei Progress of 11 September 2008
 Sudan Photographic Exhibition - Documentary photographer's images of Sudan's displaced
Between Two Worlds: A Personal Journey , Photographs by Eli Reed of the Lost Boys of Sudan
 John Dau Sudan Foundation: transforming healthcare in Southern Sudan
 The Juba Post - South Sudan's Independent Newspaper
 Al Rai el am- Biggest Sudan newspaper-Arabic
 IRIN humanitarian news and analysis - Sudan
 Photos of industrial and military production - Sudan
 Sudan Organisation Against Torture
 Africa Floods Appeal
 SudanList Classified Advertising
 Sudanese Online News (in Arabic)
 The Small Arms Survey - Sudan
 The Carter Center information on Sudan
 2008 Travel Photos from Sudan

Sudan
 1